{{Infobox person 
| name = François Quesnel
| image = Self-portrait of François Quesnel engraved by Michel Lasne - Hustin 1910 pIX - HathiTrust (detail).png
| caption = François Quesnel,self-portrait, 1613,engraved by Michel Lasne
| birth_date = 1543 
| birth_place = Edinburgh, Scotland
| death_date = 1619
| death_place = Paris, France 
| father = Pierre Quesnel
| occupation = Painter
}}
François Quesnel (c. 1543–1619) was a French painter of Scottish extraction.

Biography
The son of the French painter Pierre Quesnel and his Scottish wife Madeleine Digby, born in Edinburgh while his father worked for Mary of Guise, Quesnel found patronage at the French court of Catherine de Medici and her son, Henri III (illustration). He married Charlotte Richandeau, with whom he had four children. A widower, he remarried in  1584  Marguerite Le Masson, who gave him ten more children, among whom were Nicolas (died 1632) and Augustin, painters, and Jacques, bookseller.

In le Paris he worked as a decorator and a designer of cartoons for tapestry, but it is as a portrait painter, both in oils and in delicately tinted pencil or red and black chalk, that he is chiefly remembered. Some portraits were engraved by Thomas de Leu and Michel Lasne, and in 1609 he drew a map of Paris for engraving by Pierre Vallet.  He died in le Paris.

Tapestry designs
In 1585 François provided a cartoon for a tapestry of Christ preaching on the steps of the Temple for the Church of Saint Madeleine in Paris. In August 1586, François contracted to provide designs for tapestries of the Life of the Virgin'' for Renée of Guise Lorraine, Abbess of the Convent of Saint-Pierre-les-Dames at Reims and sister of his father's employer in Scotland, Mary of Guise (who was buried in the Convent). The eight tapestries and his cartoons were to be 1.5 ells in height, and 10.25 ells in length. Each was to include the heraldry of the Abbess in the centre. The cost of this design work was 5 ecu sols per Paris ell. These tapestries following his designs were woven in Paris.

Gallery

External links and images

 Several portrait drawings, some identified sitters, Harvard Art Museums
 Engraving of François Quesnel by Pierre Brebiette, Joconde database, with motto 'Quo pedibus Ferri non queo mente Feror.'
 Portrait of a Noblewoman (attributed), Detroit Institute of Arts
 Portrait of a Bearded Man (attributed), Cleveland Museum of Art
 Portrait of a Bearded Man (attributed), Royal Collection
 Portrait of a Nobleman, 1589 (attributed), Ackland Art Museum, University of North Carolina
 Biography of Quesnel (in French)

Notes

16th-century French painters
French male painters
17th-century French painters
16th-century Scottish painters
Scottish male painters
17th-century Scottish painters
1619 deaths
1540s births
French people of Scottish descent
Artists from Edinburgh
French Mannerist painters
French tapestry artists